Tortilla Flat is a 1942 American romantic comedy film directed by Victor Fleming and starring Spencer Tracy, Hedy Lamarr, John Garfield, Frank Morgan, Akim Tamiroff, and Sheldon Leonard based on the 1935 novel of the same name by John Steinbeck.
Frank Morgan received an Academy Award nomination for Best Supporting Actor for his poignant portrayal of The Pirate.

Plot
Danny inherits two houses in the central coastal area of California, "just outside the old seaport town of Monterey." So, Pilon and his poor idle friends move in. One of them, the Pirate, is saving money which Pilon endeavors to steal, until he discovers that it is being collected to purchase a golden candlestick which Pirate intends to burn to honor St. Francis, for healing his sick dog, that later is run over and killed. One of Danny's houses burns down, so he allows his friends to move into the other house with him, and in gratitude Pilon tries to make life better for his friend. Things are fine at first until Danny's passion for a lovely girl named Dolores causes him to actually go to work in a fishing business. A misunderstanding caused by Pilon about a vacuum cleaner Danny had bought for the girl, enrages Danny; he becomes drunk and a bit crazy. He almost dies in an accident while interrupting the girl at her work in a cannery, but through Pilon's prayers, is restored to health. Danny then marries his sweetheart with the promise that he will become a fisherman now that Pilon has raised the money to buy him a boat. The movie's happy ending is quite different from the novel's ending, in which Danny dies after a fall.

Cast
 Spencer Tracy as Pilon
 Hedy Lamarr as Dolores Sweets Ramirez
 John Garfield as Daniel Alvarez
 Frank Morgan as The Pirate
 Akim Tamiroff as Pablo
 Sheldon Leonard as Tito Ralph
 John Qualen as José Maria Corcoran
 Donald Meek as Paul D. Cummings
 Connie Gilchrist as Mrs. Torelli
 Allen Jenkins as Big Joe Portagee
 Henry O'Neill as Father Juan Ramon
 Mercedes Ruffino as Mrs. Marellis
 Nina Campana as Señora Teresina Cortez
 Arthur Space as Mr. Brown
 Betty Wells as Cesca
 Harry Burns as Torelli
 Terry (Toto) as Dog

Reception
According to MGM records the film earned $1,865,000 at the US and Canadian box office and $746,000 elsewhere, making the studio a profit of $542,000.

Critical response
Film critic Bosley Crowther gave the film a positive review, writing that the film "is really a little idyll which turns its back on a workaday world...it is filled with solid humor and compassion—and that is pleasant, even for folks who have to work."

Awards

Nominations
 Best Supporting Actor - Frank Morgan

References

External links
 
 
 
 
 

1942 films
American black-and-white films
Films scored by Franz Waxman
Films based on American novels
Films based on works by John Steinbeck
Films directed by Victor Fleming
Films set in California
Films set in the 1930s
Films shot in California
Metro-Goldwyn-Mayer films
Films with screenplays by Benjamin Glazer
American romantic comedy films
1942 romantic comedy films
1940s English-language films
1940s American films